Notre Dame Preparatory School is a small coeducational, private school established in 1952. It is located one hour from Boston.

The population of the school is average 32–42 students. It is a small sized boarding and day school. The school is primarily known for its basketball program which has developed college and professional players as well as a private college prep school.

Background
Notre Dame Preparatory School was established in 1952 by the Brothers of the Sacred Heart.

Notable alumni

 Steven Adams (1993–) center drafted by the Oklahoma City Thunder in the first round of the   2013 NBA draft picked no.12.
 Warren J. Baker, university president
 Michael Beasley (1989–) forward for the Los Angeles Lakers basketball team.
 Will Blalock (1983–) point guard with the Reno Bighorns of the NBA D-League
 Derrick Caracter (1988–) power forward/center for Bnei Herzliya in Israel. Transferred to Notre Dame during his junior year.
 Marcus Douthit (1999) forward-center who played for the Providence Friars. Douthit was drafted by the Los Angeles Lakers in the 2004 NBA Draft.
 Kim English – Detroit Pistons shooting guard
 Chester Frazier - current assistant basketball coach at Kansas State
 Ryan Gomes (1982–) basketball player currently with the Artland Dragons of the Basketball Bundesliga.
 Paul Harris (1986) – basketball player for Syracuse University.
 Lazar Hayward (1986–) basketball player who played three seasons in the NBA.
 Shawn James – professional basketball player for Maccabi Tel Aviv
 Sean Kilpatrick (1990-) - former Cincinnati Bearcat and current shooting guard for the Chicago Bulls; basketball player for Hapoel Jerusalem of the Israeli Basketball Super League

References

External links
 School website

Catholic secondary schools in Massachusetts
Schools in Worcester County, Massachusetts
Educational institutions established in 1952
Private middle schools in Massachusetts
1952 establishments in Massachusetts